Dario Borghesan (born December 11, 1979) is an American lawyer from Alaska who is an associate justice of the Alaska Supreme Court.

Early life and education 

Borghesan was born in Anchorage, Alaska, in 1979. He studied political science at Amherst College, graduating in 2002 with a Bachelor of Arts magna cum laude. He was a Peace Corps volunteer in Togo from 2002 to 2004. He attended the University of Michigan Law School, graduating in 2008 with a Juris Doctor magna cum laude and Order of the Coif honors.

Legal career 
Borghesan served as a law clerk to Justice Daniel Winfree of the Alaska Supreme Court from 2008 to 2009. He then joined the Alaska Department of Law, where he worked in various roles from 2009 to 2020, including as the supervising attorney of the department's civil appeals section.

Alaska Supreme Court 

Borghesan was one of eight candidates who applied to fill a vacancy on the Alaska Supreme Court caused by Justice Craig Stowers’ retirement. The Alaska Judicial Council submitted his name, along with those of three other candidates, to Governor Mike Dunleavy. On July 1, 2020, Dunleavy announced his appointment of Borghesan.

References 

1979 births
Living people
21st-century American lawyers
21st-century American judges
Justices of the Alaska Supreme Court
Amherst College alumni
Lawyers from Anchorage, Alaska
Peace Corps volunteers
University of Michigan Law School alumni